The 1987 Rugby World Cup Final was the final match in the 1987 Rugby World Cup, the first Rugby World Cup played.

It was played at Eden Park in Auckland, New Zealand on 20 June 1987 between the hosts New Zealand and France. The referee of the match was the Australian Kerry Fitzgerald and the touch judges were Jim Fleming and Brian Anderson, both from Scotland.

New Zealand won the match 29–9 with three tries, one conversion, four penalties and a drop goal, becoming the first winners of the Rugby World Cup.

This same matchup would be contested again at the 2011 final, with New Zealand again becoming the world champions.

Match

Summary

First half
In front of a capacity crowd at Eden Park, hosts New Zealand met France in the inaugural Rugby World Cup Final. France seemed lacklustre following their amazing win over Australia in the semi-final. New Zealand played a mainly kicking game in the first half with Grant Fox kicking for territory and position. A Fox drop goal after 14 minutes settled home nerves. A try by the World Cup's star performer Michael Jones, followed just three minutes later. Jones' try was converted by Fox, a tense final was finely balanced at half time with New Zealand leading France 9–0.

Second half
France came out with renewed vigour after the break and a Didier Camberabero penalty four minutes into the half finally put France on the scoreboard. The France fightback was, however, short-lived and New Zealand forward power in the setpiece and open play was to the fore. Tries by David Kirk and John Kirwan together with the relentlessly accurate goal-kicking of Fox meant that going into the final moments New Zealand led 29–3.

A final surge near the whistle led to a France try through Pierre Berbizier. The try was converted as the last kick of the game by Didier Camberabero.

The final had hardly lived up to its billing, probably due to the exertions by France in their semi-final win. It was however fitting that tries from three stars of the tournament, Jones, Kirk and Kirwan, won the contest and gave New Zealand the Webb Ellis Cup.

Details

References

External links
Match Report at ESPN
Match Report at Allblacks.com
Match Report at RugbyRefs.com

1987
1987 in New Zealand rugby union
1986–87 in French rugby union
France national rugby union team matches
New Zealand national rugby union team matches
History of rugby union matches between France and New Zealand